Amber Gersjes (born 23 June 1997) is a Dutch judoka. She won a bronze medal at the  2021 Judo Grand Prix Zagreb.

References

External links
 

1997 births
Living people
Dutch female judoka
Sportspeople from Tilburg
20th-century Dutch women
21st-century Dutch women